Everett Russell Bailey, M.D. (March 30, 1888 – October 22, 1932) was an American physician who served as a First Lieutenant and an army doctor in 365th Ambulance Company and Battalion Gas Officer during World War I.  He specialized in treating gas inflicted patients.

Early life
Bailey was born in New Castle, Indiana.  His parents were Reverend John Bailey and Cora Dempsey Bailey. In 1910, Bailey graduated from Meharry Medical College, at the age of 22.  He was married by 1914. In 1917, after being a practicing physician for seven years, Bailey volunteered for service in World War I and was granted First Lieutenant in the Military Reserve Corps.

Military service
Bailey completed his training in 44 days and was sent to Fort Riley to be a part of the 92nd Division's medical unit.  He was later given to the 365th Ambulance Company and departed with a couple of physicians and personal to France in 1918.

Once he arrived in France, Bailey was designated the Battalion Gas Officer and had two assisting officers assigned to help him.  In the region he was assigned, there were a large number of gas attacks and he was given the additional responsibility of being a part of the constant gas mask drills.  Bailey was given specialized training for the treatment of gas casualties and he was later transferred to the 366th Field Hospital. The 92nd Division was facing aggressive assaults from the so the 366th Hospital frequently received ailments from such attacks.

For the remainder of the war, Bailey worked tirelessly at the hospital which constantly filled with gas related ailments.  Each hospital in the division was made to accommodate around 200 patients. In the course of three weeks alone, Bailey treated near to 200 gas injuries.  The common ailments accompanying gas infestation were Mustard gas poisoning and Arsene poisoning, each causing excessive respiratory problems.

Career
Bailey returned to Louisville, Kentucky, with his wife.  Bailey moved to Indianapolis, Indiana and started his own practice.  Around 1931, Bailey and his wife moved to Chicago and his move was mentioned in the Chicago Defender.

Death
A year after moving to Chicago, Bailey died from complications of gas exposure from the war.  His body was returned to New Castle, Indiana.  Bailey was buried in South Mound Cemetery and his grave was given a military headstone.

Personal life
By 1914, Bailey was married to Drusilla Bailey and the couple lived in Louisville, Kentucky until he began his military service.  Drusilla and Everett had one infant son together who died in 1914 shortly after his birth.

References

1932 deaths
1888 births
United States Army Medical Corps officers
United States Army personnel of World War I
African Americans in World War I
20th-century African-American physicians
Military personnel from Indiana
People from New Castle, Indiana
African-American United States Army personnel